Saraskhaneh (also romanized as Sarāskhāneh) is a village in Kuh Mareh Khami Rural District, in the Central District of Basht County, Kohgiluyeh and Boyer-Ahmad Province, Iran. At the 2006 census, its population was 71, in 17 families.

References 

Populated places in Basht County